Robert Hall Haynes, OC, FRSC (August 27, 1931 – December 22, 1998) was a Canadian geneticist and biophysicist.  He was the Distinguished Research Professor in the Department of Biology at York University. Haynes was best known for his contributions to the study of DNA repair and mutagenesis, and for helping promote the concept of terraforming through his invention of the term, ecopoiesis.

Haynes was one of the earliest geneticists to recognize the fundamental biologic importance of the vulnerability of DNA to damage and therefore the central role of DNA repair processes.  As he noted, “DNA is composed of rather ordinary molecular subunits, which certainly are not endowed with any peculiar kind of quantum mechanical stability.  Its very chemical vulgarity makes it prey to all the chemical horrors and misfortune that might befall any such molecule in a warm aqueous medium.”

Haynes early life and scientific contributions have been summarized by Kunz et al. (1993) and Kunz and Hanawalt (1999).

Incomplete timeline

 1953, Haynes receives a degree in Mathematics and Physics, at the University of Western Ontario.
 1957, Ph.D. in Biophysics, UWO
 1984, Haynes creates the word ecopoiesis, a term that came to be widely used by writers and some proponents of terraforming and space exploration.
 1987, The Genetics Society of Canada creates the Robert H. Haynes Young Scientist Award.
 1988, Haynes serves as President of the 16th International Congress of Genetics.
 1990, He is made an Officer of the Order of Canada.
 1995 Haynes becomes the 104th President of the Royal Society of Canada

Selected publications

Presidential Address

Planetary engineering

 in 
Haynes, Robert H. (1990) Etablierung von Leben auf dem Mars durch gerichtete Panspermie: Technische und ethische Probleme der Okopoese," Biol. Zent. bl. 109. 193-205.

Haynes, Robert. (1993) How Mars Might Become a Home for Humans. The Illustrated Encyclopedia of Mankind.

References

External links
 Royal Society of Canada: 104th President
 Environmental Mutagen Society
 Genetics Society of Canada: Robert H. Haynes Young Scientist Award

1931 births
1998 deaths
Canadian biophysicists
Canadian geneticists
Canadian physicists
Fellows of the Royal Society of Canada
Officers of the Order of Canada
University of Western Ontario alumni
Academic staff of York University
20th-century Canadian biologists